This is a list of members of the 33rd Legislative Assembly of Queensland from 1953 to 1956, as elected at the 1953 state election held on 7 March 1953.

 On 17 August 1953, the Labor member for Maryborough, David Farrell, died. Labor candidate Horace Davies won the resulting by-election on 28 November 1953.
 On 9 December 1954, the Labor member for Flinders and the Secretary for Mines and Immigration, Ernest Riordan, died. Labor candidate and former Prime Minister Frank Forde won the resulting by-election on 12 March 1955.

See also
1953 Queensland state election
Gair Ministry (Labor) (1952–1957)

References

 Waterson, D.B. Biographical register of the Queensland Parliament, 1930-1980 Canberra: ANU Press (1982)
 

Members of Queensland parliaments by term
20th-century Australian politicians